Dalibor Cyril Vačkář (19 September 1906 – 21 October 1984) was one of the most popular contemporary Czech composers, renowned throughout Czechoslovakia.

Dalibor C. Vačkář was born on 19 September 1906, on the island of Korčula (Curzola) in the Adriatic, a son of Václav Vačkář (1881–1954), a musician who later became synonymous with Czech popular music, and Johanna Faltysová, an actress.

Vačkář studied composition with Josef Suk (a pupil and son-in-law of Antonín Dvořák), and violin with Karel Hoffman at the Prague Conservatory, and graduated in 1931. His early compositions reflect the influence of his teacher Josef Suk. They are lyrical, heartfelt and contemplative, and express new formations of harmony and timbre. However, the new musical language of pre-war modernism and the spontaneity of jazz prompted him to set out on his own compositional path.

From early on he was attracted to solo and concert compositions for a wide variety of instruments. The source of this can be found in part in the legacy of his father, the popular composer of waltzes, marches, serenades and songs with whom he also wrote a very popular "Instrumentation for symphony orchestra and brass music“ and also from his own experience as a professional instrumentalist. He created two violin concertos, a piano concerto, a concert for organ, harpsichord, oboe, clarinet, concerto for bassoon, a jazz concerto for trumpet, a concerto for percussions, and one for trombone. All these works have in common unusual and interesting instrumental combinations and rhythmic drive.

Notable among his chamber music compositions are: Concerto for string quartet, 2 sonatas for violin and piano - Dedication and Musica Intima, Furiant for string trio, the brass quintet, compositions for guitar and flute, guitar and cello, for trumpet and organ, numerous pieces for piano and other.

When he reached the zenith of his creativity, Vačkář became a wholeheartedly modern composer who, nevertheless, remained true to his Czech roots. In all of his music, harmonies, rhythms and instrumentation are marked by great gusto and dialogue between his inner self and the "roaring world" outside.

From his orchestral works the most accomplished are: Smoking symphony, third of his five symphonies, the Symphoniette for French Horn, Piano and Orchestra, the Symphonic Scherzo, the Furiant, the Appellatio for Orchestra and Choir Prelude for Chamber Orchestra, Extempore 84 and a wide range of vocal compositions.

Additionally, his popular dance songs and numerous film scores were widely popular in the Czech Republic and won him a permanent place in the hearts of many native listeners.

Dalibor C. Vačkář died in Prague on 21 October 1984, and is buried at the Vinohrady Cemetery.

External links
 Extensive Biography
 Vačkář website

Czech composers
Czech male composers
1906 births
1984 deaths
People from Korčula
20th-century composers
20th-century Czech male musicians